Lance is a surname. Notable people with the surname include:

Albert Lance (1925–2013), Australian operatic tenor
Bert Lance, American businessman, advisor to President Jimmy Carter
Dean Lance, Australian rugby league footballer and coach
Herb Lance, American singer, songwriter and DJ
James Lance (born 1974), British actor
James W. Lance (1926–2019), Australian neurologist
Leonard Lance, American politician
Major Lance (born 1939?), American soul singer
Tiger Lance (1940–2010), South African cricketer
Trey Lance (born 2000), American football player
Wesley Lance (1908–2007), American politician

Fictional characters
Dinah Laurel Lance, also known as Black Canary, a superheroine in DC Comics
Laurel Lance (Arrowverse), also known as Black Canary, a character in the television series Arrow who was adapted from the DC comics character
Larry Lance, a character in DC Comics who is the father of Dinah Laurel Lance
Sara Lance, also known as White Canary, a character from the Arrowverse television franchise

See also
Lance (given name)
Lance (disambiguation)